Philodendron ornatum is a species of evergreen climbing plant in the genus Philodendron native to tropical South America and Trinidad and Tobago. It is categorized as a rare or uncommon plant species due to its limited distribution in the wild. This species is highly regarded for its striking appearance, featuring large, glossy green leaves that have a light-green margin, midrib, and primary veins, making it a popular ornamental plant.

It is also known for its air-purifying properties. Its ability to remove harmful toxins from the air makes it an excellent choice for indoor environments where air quality can be a concern.

Philodendron ornatum has distinct leaves, stems, and flowers that can vary in appearance depending on the specific cultivar. Proper care involves attention to humidity, light, temperature, watering, and fertilization.

References 

ornatum